Eric "XI" the Lisp and Lame Swedish: Erik Eriksson or Erik läspe och halte; Old Norse: Eiríkr Eiríksson (1216 – 2 February 1250) was king of Sweden in 1222–29 and 1234–50. Being the last ruler of the House of Eric, he stood in the shadow of a succession of powerful Jarls, especially his brother-in-law Birger Jarl, whose descendants ruled as kings after his death.

Background
Eric was the son of Eric X of Sweden and Richeza of Denmark. According to the chronicle Erikskrönikan, written in the early 1320s, Eric is said to have been partly lame; "King Eric was lisping in his talk / Limping was, as well, his walk". For this reason, later historians referred to him as "Erik the Lisp and Lame" which was apparently not used in his own time. Eric was born after his father, King Eric X, had already died (1216). The fifteen-year-old John I from the rival House of Sverker was hailed king by the Swedish aristocracy, while Queen Richeza returned to her Danish homeland where her brother Valdemar Sejr ruled.

Eric spent his early youth in Denmark, while Valdemar championed his rights to the Swedish throne and tried to prevent the coronation of John I. Pope Honorius III ordered three North German bishops to investigate the issue in 1219, however to no avail. John I nevertheless died in 1222, whereby the House of Sverker became extinct in the male line.

First reign

With no dynastic rivals at hand, the six-year-old Eric was hailed as king, sometime between August 1222 and July 1223. The Archbishop Olof Basatömer supported his cause and appears to have crowned him in Strängnäs Cathedral on 31 July 1223. During the minority of the king, a council was formed, consisting of Bishop Bengt of Skara, the king's foster father Erengisle Vig, Stenar, Knut Kristinesson, and Knut Holmgersson (Knut the Tall). The two last-mentioned were second cousins of King Eric. In 1225 Eric and his realm were taken under the protection of the Pope. In the same year a brief conflict with Norway flared up, as King Håkon Håkonson made an incursion into Värmland in retaliation for support given to Håkon's Norwegian enemies. The members of the royal council were termed consiliarii (Sw., rådsherre), a term that now occurs for the first time in a Swedish context. However, the internal cohesion of the council was weak, and its members were considered notoriously unreliable. Knut Kristinesson went to Norway in 1226 in order to claim the crown of this country, and Bishop Bengt died in 1228.

In the next year 1229, a feud broke out, as Knut the Tall and a party of nobles, the Folkung Party, rose against the young ruler. The causes are not known, but a wish by some nobles to restrain the power of the Church might have had a role. Eric was overthrown after the battle of Olustra (slaget vid Olustra). The battle is believed to have taken place in Olustra (Ostra) in Södermanland, although Alvastra in Östergötland has been mentioned as a possible site. After his loss, the young king fled to Denmark where his uncle Valdemar Sejr was still ruling. Knut the Tall was crowned King Canute II of Sweden in 1231, but his time was short and he died in 1234.

Second reign
According to a Danish source, Eric returned to Sweden already in 1232, when Canute was still king. The Swedish Erikskrönikan on the contrary asserts that he came back after King Canute's death, after a new round of fighting. At any rate Eric was once again accepted as king and ruled until his own death in 1250. At first, he reconciled with the Folkung Party. The Folkung Ulf Fase, who had been Jarl of the realm under Canute II, continued to serve in that function under Eric. Ulf Fase was an able politician who managed to prevent feuding between the noble factions for many years. As a king, Eric is depicted in Erikskrönikan as good-natured but physically passive:

He liked to strengthen reason and right,
and was pleased to care for his own kin.
He maintained domestic honour and noble custom,
and gave the peasant good peace,
He well understood serious matters,
but would not care much for tournaments.

In fact he was relatively insignificant and heavily dependent on stronger men in his entourage; first Ulf Fase and, after his death (1248), the latter's kinsman Birger Magnusson (Birger Jarl) (d. 1266). They were both scions of the large and influential  Bjälbo family from Östergötland, but entertained different political agendas. While Ulf pursued a policy of alliance with the Norwegian king, Birger strove to strengthen royal authority by allying closely with the Catholic Church. In about the late 1230s, King Eric's elder sister Ingeborg was married to Birger, in the latter's first marriage. Birger was purportedly the son of a female heiress of the Sverker dynasty, thus having royal blood.

Eastward expansion
Sweden had a certain presence in south-western Finland by the early 13th century, although it is unclear to what extent this translated into political power. A bishopric existed in Nousiainen and later Turku (Åbo), which stood under the papal legate of the Baltic region. The Erikskrönikan contains a graphic description of a military expedition to Tavastia further to the east that King Eric dispatched in an unspecified year, possibly in 1238–39 or 1249–50. While not literally a crusade, the professed aim was to Christianize still pagan lands. A sizable fleet was assembled under the leadership of Birger and sailed over to Tavastia (a problematic statement since Tavastia is an inland region). According to the highly propagandist chronicle, the expedition was an unqualified success:

They took their banners and went ashore,
The Christians were successful in the war.
They let their shields shine 
all over the land, and so their helmets.
They were keen to try their swords
on the pagan Tavasts
As I expect, they achieved
gold and silver and large herds.
The Tavasts then ran and were gone,
the pagans lost and the Christians won.
Anyone who wanted to serve them,
and become Christian and accept baptism,
they allowed to keep goods and life,
and to live in peace without further strife.
To any pagan who would not do that,
they administered death.

The expedition led to the establishment of a permanent fortress, Tavasteborg, and the formal Christianization of the region. As the chronicle has it, "I think the Russian king lost it". The enterprise is not mentioned in other sources, and its circumstances are hotly debated among modern historians. It is possibly connected to a Swedish foray in the Novgorod Republic in 1240. A fleet of ships commanded by a certain Spiridon and accompanied by a few bishops went up the Neva River, but were attacked and routed by the Novgorodian prince Alexander Nevsky. Details of the battle are partly legendary, and its significance might have been exaggerated in Russian historiography. According to a 14th-century source, the Swedish leader was a Belgerd, corresponding to Birger, though this may be a later construction.

Renewed domestic feuding
Internal fighting once again broke out in 1247, shortly before (or possibly after) Ulf Fase's death. The Folkung Party warred with King Eric and Birger, but their peasant allies in Uppland lost the Battle of Sparrsätra and were punished by tightening royal taxation. The Folkung leader Holmger Knutsson, a son of Canute II, fled to Gästrikland but was captured by Eric's men and beheaded.

Shortly after the defeat of the uprising, Birger was appointed Jarl of the realm. As such he oversaw a clerical meeting in Skänninge in February 1248, summoned by the papal legate William of Sabina. On behalf of Pope Innocent IV, he urged the Swedes to stick to canonic-juridical praxis as laid down by Rome. The authority of the bishops was strengthened and Sweden was increasingly incorporated in the Catholic Church.

Family and heirs

Eric married Queen Catherine in 1243 or 1244. She was the daughter of (Jarl) Sune Folkason of Bjälbo and an heiress of the House of Sverker. In that way the two long-competing royal houses were eventually united. Commonly, sources say that Eric was childless, but some sources claim that he had a couple of baby daughters who died.

Eric XI died on 2 February 1250, and was buried in the monastery of Varnhem Abbey in Västergötland. With him the House of Eric became extinct in the male line, with the possible exception of Canute II's son Filip (d. 1251). Under these circumstances the throne went to the offspring of Birger Jarl and Ingeborg, the more since Birger was now in full control over the realm. Their eldest but still under-age son Valdemar was elected king in 1250 to succeed Eric, possibly by-passing the sons, to the extent there were such, of Ingeborg's elder sisters. Birger Jarl became the Regent, holding the true power in Sweden until his own death in 1266. Skáldatal reports that Óláfr Þórðarson was one of Eric's court skalds.

References

Further reading
 Bolin, Sture, "Erik Eriksson", Svenskt biografiskt lexikon .
 Harrison, Dick, Sveriges historia: medeltiden (Stockholm: Liber, 2002).
 Harrison, Dick, Jarlens sekel - En berättelse om 1200-talets Sverige ( Stockholm: Ordfront, 2002). 
 Harrison, Dick, "Birger jarl och Aleksandr Nevskij", Svenska Dagbladet Blog, 1 May 2011 .
 Lagerqvist, Lars O.; Åberg, Nils, Litet lexikon över Sveriges regenter (Boda kyrkby: Vincent förlag, 2004). 
 Lindström, Henrik; Lindström, Fredrik, Svitjods undergång och Sveriges födelse (Stockholm: Albert Bonniers förlag, 2006). .
 Line, Philip, Kingship and State Formation in Sweden 1130-1290 (Leiden: Brill, 2007).
 Pipping, Rolf (ed.), Erikskrönikan (Uppsala: Almqvist & Wicksell, 1921).

External links

1216 births
1250 deaths
13th-century Swedish monarchs
Rulers of Finland
Monarchs deposed as children
Medieval child monarchs
Christians of the Second Swedish Crusade
House of Eric
Royalty and nobility with disabilities
People with speech impediment
Burials at Varnhem Abbey
Sons of kings